Leo Goodwin Jr. was born to the co-founders of GEICO: Lillian Goodwin and Leo Goodwin Sr. He became involved in the family business. He filed for personal bankruptcy in 1976, and he died at the age of 63 on January 15, 1978, of cancer in Fort Lauderdale, Florida,  following a two-month hospital stay.

References

1978 deaths
American businesspeople in insurance
Year of birth missing